is a Japanese footballer who plays as a goalkeeper for  club Sanfrecce Hiroshima.

Career
After attending Toin University of Yokohama, Tanaka joined SC Sagamihara in January 2018. After two seasons with the club, Tanaka moved to Blaublitz Akita for the 2020 season and helped them gain promotion to the J2 League. He went on to make over 100 appearances for Akita in three seasons at the club, before moving to J1 League team Sanfrecce Hiroshima for the 2023 season.

Club statistics
Updated to 26 November 2022.

Honours
 Blaublitz Akita
 J3 League (1): 2020

Individual
 Milk Soccer Academy Data Awards 2020 J3 MVP

References

External links
 Yudai Tanaka at J.LEAGUE Data Site (archived) 
 Yudai Tanaka at J.LEAGUE.jp (archive) 
 Yudai Tanaka at SC Sagamihara (archived) 

1995 births
Living people
Toin University of Yokohama alumni
Association football people from Miyagi Prefecture
Japanese footballers
J2 League players
J3 League players
SC Sagamihara players
Blaublitz Akita players
Sanfrecce Hiroshima players
Association football goalkeepers